YaQuis Bertron "Duke" Shelley (born October 8, 1996) is an American football cornerback who is currently an NFL free agent. He played college football at Kansas State.

Early life & high school
Shelley grew up in Tucker, Georgia and attended Tucker High School. He was a three-year starter for the Tigers and was ranked the 22nd best cornerback in his class by Rivals.com and 33rd by ESPN.

College career
In four years at Kansas State, Shelley recorded 165 career tackles and eight interceptions.

During his junior year in 2017, Shelley started all 12 games and recorded 13 pass breakups, fourth most in the Big 12 Conference, and was given honorable mention all-conference honors. His senior year was marred by a season-ending toe injury after seven games.

Professional career

Chicago Bears
Shelley was drafted by the Chicago Bears in the sixth round (205th overall) in the 2019 NFL Draft. Shelley signed a four-year rookie contract with the team on June 20, 2019 worth $2,647,832, including a $127,832 signing bonus. Shelley made his NFL debut on September 5, 2019 in the season opener against the Green Bay Packers. He played in nine games as a rookie, mostly on special teams.

Shelley entered the 2021 season as the third cornerback on the depth chart behind Jaylon Johnson and Kindle Vildor. He played in nine games with three starts before suffering a hamstring injury in Week 11. He was placed on injured reserve on November 23, 2021. He was activated on December 21.

On August 31, 2022, Shelley was waived by the Bears.

Minnesota Vikings
On September 6, 2022, Shelley signed with the practice squad of the Minnesota Vikings. He was promoted to the active roster on November 12.

References

External links
Chicago Bears bio
Kansas State Wildcats bio

Living people
1996 births
American football cornerbacks
Chicago Bears players
Kansas State Wildcats football players
Minnesota Vikings players
People from Tucker, Georgia
Players of American football from Georgia (U.S. state)
Sportspeople from DeKalb County, Georgia
Tucker High School alumni